Kenneth Udjus (born 2 July 1983 in Kristiansand) is a Norwegian football goalkeeper who plays for Asker.

Youth career
He played as a defender as a junior in IK Start, until Thomas Gill discovered his goalkeeping abilities by chance when Udjus was 17.

In the 2012 season he kept a clean sheet for 558 minutes, which at the time was a record in the Norwegian top division. The record has since been broken by Sondre Rossbach (730 minutes).

Other
He is the grandson of the Norwegian politician Ragnar Udjus.

Career statistics

Honours
Kniksen award: Goalkeeper of the year (2012)

References

External links
 

1983 births
Living people
Sportspeople from Kristiansand
Norwegian footballers
Tromsø IL players
FK Tønsberg players
SK Brann players
Løv-Ham Fotball players
Sogndal Fotball players
Lillestrøm SK players
Norwegian First Division players
Eliteserien players
Association football goalkeepers
FK Arendal players
IFK Norrköping players
Asker Fotball players